The Slat Lkahal Synagogue (Hebrew בית כנסת צלאת לקהל) (Arabic: كنيس صلاة القهال) is a synagogue located in the Mellah (Jewish quarter) of the medina of Essaouira, in Morocco.

The synagogue was built from 1850 with funds raised by members of the community who mingled with the crowds at funeral ceremonies and begged for alms, and was inaugurated in 1859.

"Slat Lkahal" which means "Synagogue of the Community" is also called the “Synagogue of the Poor”. It has also served as a Hebrew learning facility for children.

References 

Essaouira
Synagogues in Morocco